The Punjab Plain is a large alluvial plain in Eastern Pakistan and Northwestern India. The plain includes the Pakistani province of Punjab and the Indian states of Punjab and Haryana, and parts of Rajasthan. This plain is around 200–300 meters above mean sea level. The plain is extensively farmed for cereals and cotton.

The plain is the western part of the North Indian River Plain, formed by the Indus River and its tributaries - the Jhelum, the Chenab, the Ravi, the Beas and the Sutlej.

The land formed of alluvium in between two rivers known as Doab is found here.

Bhangar : The flood plains formed due to deposition of older alluvium is known as Bhangar.

Bet : The flood plains seen here which are formed due to repeated deposition of new alluvium during each flood is known as Bet. The plains are in the plain biomes.

References

Plains of India
Landforms of Punjab, India
Landforms of Haryana
Plains of Pakistan